Bulgunnyakhtakh (Bulgunñaxtaax) is a rural locality (a selo) and the administrative center of Malzhagarsky 1-y Rural Okrug of Khangalassky District in the Sakha Republic, Russia, located  from Pokrovsk, the administrative center of the district. Its population as of the 2010 Census was 1,529; down from 1,601 recorded in the 2002 Census.

References

Notes

Sources
Official website of the Sakha Republic. Registry of the Administrative-Territorial Divisions of the Sakha Republic. Khangalassky District. 

Rural localities in Khangalassky District